Rodger Maus (September 15, 1932 – March 16, 2017) was an American art director and production designer. He was the art director for 103 episodes (1973–1978) of the 251 episode television series M*A*S*H.

He shared an Emmy award in 1995 for Outstanding Individual Achievement in Art Direction for a Miniseries or a Special for episode 1 of the 1994 miniseries Scarlett. He was nominated for an Academy Award in the category Best Art Direction for the film Victor/Victoria.

Selected filmography
 Victor/Victoria (1982)

References

External links

1932 births
2017 deaths
American art directors
American production designers
Emmy Award winners